Robert Alain may refer to:
Robert Alaine (1558–1603), held an office under a nobleman in the time of Queen Elizabeth
Alain Robert (born 1962), French climber
Alain M. Robert (born 1941), mathematician